Maleeka Ghai is an Indian actress who is best recognized for her roles in TV series like as Gandhari in Dharmakshetra, as Bhadrama in Chandrakanta, as Aanchal Pandey in Desh Ki Beti Nandini,Saraswatichandra, also Maleeka Ghai has appeared in numerous Bollywood films Hum To Mohabbat Karega, Raja Ki Aayegi Baraat, Heeralal Pannalal, Agniputra.

Early life
Ghai was born in Delhi and is the daughter of Shri Rajendra Ghai (army man). She moved Mumbai in 1995, to pursue her dreams

Television

References

21st-century Indian actresses
Year of birth missing (living people)
Actresses in Hindi cinema
Indian film actresses
Living people
Actresses from Mumbai
Actresses in Hindi television